Edward Miller Mundy may refer to:
 Edward Miller Mundy (1750–1822), MP for Derbyshire 1784–1822
 Edward Miller Mundy (1800–1849), MP for South Derbyshire 1841–49